Levécourt is a commune in the Haute-Marne department in north-eastern France. The Hemony brothers, carillon bell founders in Amsterdam in the 17th century, were born here.

See also
Communes of the Haute-Marne department

References

Communes of Haute-Marne